Farciminariidae is a family of bryozoans belonging to the order Cheilostomatida.

Genera:
 Columnella Levinsen, 1914
 Didymozoum Harmer, 1923
 Farciminaria Busk, 1852
 Farciminellum Harmer, 1926

References

Cheilostomatida